Nicolaas Leonard "Ted" Zegwaard (born 15 October 1903, date of death unknown) was a Dutch boxer who competed in the 1920 Summer Olympics.

He was born as the youngest child of Nicolaas Leonard Zegwaard, a diamond cutter in Amsterdam, and Hendrika Margaretha Langelaan.

In 1920 he was eliminated in the quarter-finals of the flyweight class. In the first round he won his fight against Frederic Virtue but he lost his next bout to the upcoming bronze medalist William Cuthbertson.

Zegwaard became professional some time after the Olympics. In September 1926 he moved to Australia. In March 1931 he returned to Amsterdam from Sydney, listing boxer as his profession, but in December 1935, now a worstelaar ("wrestler"), he left again to Sydney. Not able to obtain permanent residence or citizenship, he eventually moved to South Africa. In his later career he also went by the name "Jan van Houten".

References

External links
 list of Dutch boxers
 
 
 

1903 births
Year of death missing
Dutch male boxers
Boxers at the 1920 Summer Olympics
Flyweight boxers
Olympic boxers of the Netherlands
Boxers from Amsterdam
Dutch expatriates in Australia
Dutch emigrants to South Africa